John Robert Banham (22 September 1912 – 20 December 1999), was a professional rugby league footballer who represented the New Zealand national rugby league team and New South Wales City.

Playing career
Banham played for the South Sydney Rabbitohs in the NSWRL Premiership, scoring five tries between 1936 and 1937. He represented New South Wales City in 1937. In 1938 the Auckland Rugby League signed Banham as player-coach. They decided to place him with teams that would benefit from his playing and coaching. He joined the North Shore Albions initially and played the first half of the 1938 season with them before being moved to the City Rovers club for the remainder of the season. He also made 2 appearances for Newton Rangers. The first was on their trip to Christchurch to play a Canterbury XIII, and the second was in a midweek match against the touring Canterbury provincial side. On his return to the City side he helped lead them to the Roope Rooster final which they lost to Richmond Rovers by 20 to 8. Banham also played a match for Auckland Pakeha against Auckland Māori on June 6 which was won by the Māori side by 26 points to 21. On July 16 he made his Auckland debut against the returning New Zealand side who had been on tour in Australia. The match was played at Carlaw Park with Auckland winning 21 to 13 and Banham scoring one of their tries.

He was named for New Zealand in 1939 but did not play a test, due to the cancellation of the 1939 tour of Great Britain. He returned to Australia in September 1940 with the intention of joining the Australian forces. In 1941 played several games for the South Sydney Rabbitohs and scored three tries.

References

1912 births
1999 deaths
Australian rugby league players
New Zealand national rugby league team players
Auckland rugby league team players
City New South Wales rugby league team players
South Sydney Rabbitohs players
City Rovers players
North Shore Albions players
Mount Albert Lions players
Rugby league five-eighths
Place of birth missing
Rugby league players from New South Wales
South Sydney Rabbitohs captains